Insects and human ethical obligations towards them have been discussed by a number of writers and figures throughout history, many of whom, arguing from a variety of different perspectives, have contended that there exists a moral obligation towards not harming or killing insects. According to generally accepted definitions in animal welfare and agricultural ethics, however, it is argued that individual insects do not have a "right to life".

Religious perspectives

Jainism 

Jain monks take considerable precautions to avoid, even unintentionally, harming even the smallest living beings, including insects. Breaches of the fundamental principle of Ahimsā (non-violence) impacts one's karma negatively, especially when destruction of life is brought about by carelessness, though violence against insects impacts karma less so than so-called "five-sensed creatures" (e.g. humans); In Jainism, there is a hierarchy of the forms of existence, where beings are categorized according to the amount of senses they possess. Insects may differ in their count, for example, worms have two senses, ants three, and flies four. Thereby, their respective destruction affects karma differently.

Buddhism 
According to Buddhist principles, insects, are considered as sentient beings, who should not be harmed or killed. It has been described in a story of the life of the Buddha, that he once commanded monks to discontinue their travels during monsoon season, to avoid the killing of worms and insects on the muddy roads. Following the example of Jainism, Buddhist monks frequently make use of a strainer to avoid killing small animals when drinking water.

Taoism 
Jon Wynne-Tyson, in The Expanding Circle, quotes the Tai-shang kan-yingp'ien: "Have a compassionate heart toward all creatures… Even insects". He also attributes a quote to Wen Ch'ang in Yin-chih-wen, which states: "Whenever taking a step, always watch for ants and insects. Prohibit the building of fires outside (lest insects be killed)".

Judaism 
The Sefer Hasidim, a medieval Hebrew work, instructs its followers to never inflict pain on animals, including insects, and to not kill wasps or flies.

Christianity 
Soame Jenyns, an English MP and writer, argued that: "We are unable to give life, and therefore ought not wantonly to take it away from the meanest insect, without sufficient reason; they all receive it from the same benevolent hand as ourselves, and have therefore an equal right to enjoy it." William Ellery Channing stated in a letter that he would never kill an insect and asserted that insects have been given same right to life as humans by God; he also argued that killing them would spoil the work of God's creation.

Insects and their Habitations: A Book for Children, published by the Society for the Promotion of Christian Knowledge in 1833, instructed children that it was a sin against God to unnecessarily harm insects and that if they should encounter one in distress, they should not harm them, but provide them aid.

Historical perspectives 
The 11th-century Arab poet and philosopher Al-Maʿarri described the compassion of releasing a flea from his hand as being kinder that giving money to a human in need. He asserted that both the flea and human take precautions against death and have a passion to continue living.

The early animal rights writer Lewis Gompertz, an early vegan, argued against the killing of silk worms to procure silk.

Animal rights and welfare 
Peter Singer argues that a lack of knowledge around the capacity for insects to have subjective experiences means that "insect rights" is not yet something that should be campaigned for.

The entomologist Jeffrey A. Lockwood argues that:Considerable empirical evidence supports the assertion that insects feel pain and are conscious of their sensations. In so far as their pain matters to them, they have an interest in not being pained and their lives are worsened by pain. Furthermore, as conscious beings, insects have future (even if immediate) plans with regard to their own lives, and the death of insects frustrates these plans. In that sentience appears to be an ethically sound, scientifically viable basis for granting moral status and in consideration of previous arguments which establish a reasonable expectation of consciousness and pain in insects, I propose the following, minimum ethic: We ought to refrain from actions which may be reasonably expected to kill or cause nontrivial pain in insects when avoiding these actions has no, or only trivial, costs to our own welfare.

An ethical analysis around the issue of killing harmful animals (other than for meat production or product testing) concluded that it is allowable under the following conditions:
 they pose innocent threats to human life; 
 they serve as innocent shields to threats to human life; 
 we and the animals are in a "lifeboat" type of situation in which all cannot survive.
In such a situation, a prima facie right to life of an animal is overridden. In general, insects are not postulated to have such rights anyway, and moreover, agricultural ethics concerns itself with the morality of killing harmful mammals (predators, herbivores) or disease vectors (rats). "Insect killing" is strictly an ecological concern due to the use of potentially harmful insecticides, and the event of killing a single insect is quantitatively neglectable.

Cultural depictions 
It has been argued that Shakespeare expressed sympathy for insects, specifically in his 1604 play Measure for Measure, where the character Isabella states: "The sense of death is most in apprehension. / And the poor beetle that we tread upon, / In corporal sufferance finds a pang as great / As when a giant dies."

In the poem "On Cruelty", John Clare refers to rescuing flies from the webs of spiders: "E'en 'plaining flies to thee have spoke, / Poor trifles as they be; / And oft the spider's web thou'st broke, / To set the captive free."

The idiom "wouldn't hurt a fly" is used to refer to someone who is gentle and who would not do anything to cause harm or injury.

See also 
 Ahimsa
 Ethics of uncertain sentience
 Insect cognition
 Insect euthanasia
 Pain in invertebrates

References

Further reading 
 
 
 

Animal ethics
Insects in culture